Kadri Kordel is a Turkish amateur boxer in the flyweight (51 kg) division.  In 2005 he fought at the World Amateur Boxing Championships in Mianyang, China in the under 48 kilogram division.  He was beaten in the quarterfinals.  He is currently a member of the Fenerbahçe Boxing squad. A native of Kütahya, he is coached by Muammer Sağlam.

Achievements 
2004.
 1st World University Boxing Championship in Antalya, Turkey - 

2007
 22nd Ahmet Cömert International Tournament in Istanbul, Turkey - 
 5th European Union Amateur Boxing Championships in Dublin, Ireland - 

2008
 3rd World University Boxing Championship in Kazan, Russia -

References 

Date of birth unknown
People from Kütahya
Living people
Fenerbahçe boxers
Flyweight boxers
Place of birth unknown
Turkish male boxers
Year of birth missing (living people)